Bali Ram Bhagat (7 October 1922 – 2 January 2011) was an Indian politician and member of the Indian National Congress (INC). He has served as Member of Parliament (MP) in Lok Sabha representing Arrah from 1952 to 1977 and 1984 to 1989. Bhagat has also served as the 6th Speaker of the Lok Sabha and 13th Foreign Minister of India.

Bhagat was born into a wealthy Yadav family in Patna, Bihar in October 1922. He joined the Indian National Congress in 1939 during the Indian independence movement and participated in the Quit India movement. He received a bachelor's degree from Patna College and obtained a master's degree in economics from Patna University.

After independence, he served as the Member of Parliament from Arrah for six terms including the first five terms (1952-1977 & 1984-1989). Bhagat lost his seat to Chandradeo Prasad Verma in the 1977 general election, where the Congress lost power in India for the first time.

Between 1963 and 1967, Bhagat served as the Minister of State for Planning as well as Finance. He was a Minister in the Ministry of Defence for a short period in 1967 before he became the Minister of State for External Affairs in the same year.  Bhagat became a member of the cabinet in 1969 when he was appointed the Minister of Foreign Trade and Supply. Later, he was the Minister of Steel and Heavy Engineering for a period of eight months.

Bhagat served as the Speaker of Lok Sabha from 1976 to 1977, during the turbulent final year of Indira Gandhi’s first reign as prime minister. He served as Minister for External Affairs of India under Indira's son, Rajiv Gandhi, from 1985 to 1986. He was governor of Himachal Pradesh briefly during 1993, and governor of Rajasthan from 1993 to 1998. Bali Ram Bhagat died in New Delhi on 2 January 2011.

Positions held 
Bali Ram Bhagat has served 7 times as Lok Sabha MP (6 times from Arrah and once from Sitamarhi). 

He lost the 6th and 9th Lok Sabha
election from Arrah in 1977 and 1989 respectively and the 10th Lok Sabha election from Samastipur in 1991.

Note 
 The Patna-cum-Shahabad constituency was renamed as Shahabad constituency in the 2nd Lok Sabha (1957).
 The Shahabad constituency was renamed as Arrah constituency in the 6th Lok Sabha (1977).

References

1922 births
2011 deaths
India MPs 1952–1957
India MPs 1957–1962
India MPs 1962–1967
India MPs 1967–1970
India MPs 1971–1977
India MPs 1980–1984
India MPs 1984–1989
Commerce and Industry Ministers of India
Governors of Himachal Pradesh
Governors of Rajasthan
Indian National Congress (U) politicians
Indian National Congress politicians from Bihar
Lok Sabha members from Bihar
Members of the Cabinet of India
Ministers for External Affairs of India
People from Arrah
People from Samastipur district
Politicians from Patna
Speakers of the Lok Sabha
Steel Ministers of India